The Fred George Basin Greenway is a Greenway park project in northwestern Tallahassee, Florida, covering , including Fred George Sink that runs alongside Fred George Road near Capital Circle.

Under development as a public park, it is planned to have hiking trails and other low-impact recreation opportunities.

On 28 December 2015, the Tallahassee Democrat reported that the park would open on 17 February 2016.

References

Parks in Tallahassee, Florida